Allophylus marquesensis is a species of plant in the family Sapindaceae. It is extant in French Polynesia on the islands of Fatu Hiva, Hiva Oa, Tahuata and Ua Huka.

References

Flora of French Polynesia
marquesensis
Data deficient plants
Taxonomy articles created by Polbot